The Christianaires was an American black gospel music group from Sontag, Mississippi, they were active from 1989 until 2004. At its inception, The group consisted of two sibling pairs, two brothers, Arnold and Ronald Brown, and two more brothers, Paul and Tyrone Porter. Later on with the subtraction of Paul Porter and Ronald Brown, the group added George Carter and Charles Porter. They released ten albums with various labels during their tenure, and those were 1989's Walking with Me, 1990's Ain't No Way I Could and Another Step Forward, 1993's The Vision Becomes Clearer, 1995's Thru the Storm and Reaching Out, 1997's Saints Hold On, 1998's Standing Room Only, 2001's Thank You, and 2004's Stand Up! Live. The group's albums Another Step Forward, The Vision Becomes Clearer, Standing Room Only, and Thank You charted on the Billboard Gospel Albums chart.

Background
The Detroit, Michigan-based black gospel group, The Christianaires started in 1989 and ceased in 2004. They were made up of two pairs of siblings from their outset the brothers, Arnold and Ronald Brown, and the other two brothers, Paul and Tyrone Porter, which they were cousins the Browns and Porters. They would add with the departure of two of their members Paul Porter and Ronald Brown, the group would replace them with George Carter and Charles Porter.

History
The quartet released ten albums from 1989 until 2004, with four of them charting on the Billboard Gospel Albums chart. The releases were with various labels over the course of the group's tenure, and those albums were: 1989's Walking with Me, 1990's Ain't No Way I Could and Another Step Forward, 1993's The Vision Becomes Clearer, 1995's Thru the Storm and Reaching Out, 1997's Saints Hold On, 1998's Standing Room Only, 2001's Thank You, and 2004's Stand Up! Live. The four albums that charted on the Gospel Albums chart were: Another Step Forward at No. 31, The Vision Becomes Clearer at No. 17, Standing Room Only at No. 17, and Thank You at No. 8. The last one charted on the Independent Albums chart at No. 34.

Members
 Anthony Brown
 Ronald Brown
 Paul Porter
 Tyrone Porter
 George Carter
 Charles Porter

Discography

References

External links
Malaco Records profile

Musical groups established in 1989
Musical groups disestablished in 2004